The 1982 All-Ireland Under-21 Hurling Championship was the 19th staging of the All-Ireland Under-21 Hurling Championship since its establishment by the Gaelic Athletic Association in 1964. The championship began on 23 April 1982 and ended on 12 September 1982.

Tipperary entered the championship as the defending champions, however, they were beaten by Limerick in the Munster semi-final.

On 12 September 1982, Cork won the championship following a 0-12 to 0-11 defeat of Galway in the All-Ireland final. This was their eighth All-Ireland title overall and their first title since 1976.

Cork's Tony O'Sullivan was the championship's top scorer with 3-22.

Results

Leinster Under-21 Hurling Championship

Quarter-finals

Semi-finals

Final

Munster Under-21 Hurling Championship

First round

Semi-final

Final

Ulster Under-21 Hurling Championship

Final

All-Ireland Under-21 Hurling Championship

Semi-finals

Final

Championship statistics

Top scorers

Top scorers overall

Top scorers in a single game

References

Under
All-Ireland Under-21 Hurling Championship